Hood are an English indie rock band from Leeds, formed in 1991. The band consists of brothers Chris and Richard Adams, and friends (including, at times, Craig Tattersall and Andrew Johnson of The Remote Viewer, and Nicola Hodgkinson of Empress).

History

Hood's first releases were very limited vinyl singles on various small independent record labels.

In 1994, record labels Fluff and Slumberland Records released Hood's first full length album, Cabled Linear Traction.  Slumberland also released 1996's Silent '88, and the following year Happy Go Lucky Records released Structured Disasters, a compilation of tracks from singles.  All featured a large number of short tracks (many of less than a minute), a mixture of indie rock, noise experiments reminiscent of Sonic Youth or Pavement, and an increasing interest in electronics.

In 1997, Domino Records signed Hood and released the single "Useless".  Produced by Matt Elliott (better known as the Third Eye Foundation), it was a far more straightforward and tuneful song than any they had released so far.  Elliott toured with the band, and produced the albums Rustic Houses, Forlorn Valleys and The Cycle of Days and Seasons.  Like the single, these abandoned the short songs and instrumental snippets for longer pieces, with a pastoral sound similar to Bark Psychosis or Talk Talk.  The band continued to release singles for other labels; "The Weight", for 555 Recordings, was a return to the older style with eight tracks on a 7" disc.

Collaborating with friends Doseone and Why? from the Anticon collective, Hood released their fifth album, Cold House in 2001.  The work combined elements of post-rock, IDM, and indie with Doseone and Why?'s lyrical talents and featured the single "You Show No Emotion At All".

In 2003, most of the band's single and compilation tracks from the years since Structured Disasters were collected on  Singles Compiled (a double CD), and Compilations 1995-2002.  Neither contains any of the tracks recorded for Domino, but some unreleased material is included on the singles collection.

In early 2005, after additional line-up changes, Hood released Outside Closer. The tracks 'The Lost You' and 'The Negatives' were released as singles.

Since the release of Outside Closer, Hood has toured with Why? promoting his album Elephant Eyelash and released various remixes: including 'The Negatives' with vocals by British MC Jehst. Chris also has a solo side project called Bracken, and in 2007 released the album We Know About the Need on Anticon.

In 2007 Richard Adams formed a side project The Declining Winter, releasing a 7" single, The Future Sound of Hip Hop parts 1 & 2, and an album Goodbye Minnesota and further albums on a variety of labels. 

In 2012, Domino Records released a six disc compilation box set called Recollected to celebrate the 10th anniversary of the release of Cold House.

Discography

Studio albums 
Cabled Linear Traction (1994)
Silent '88 (1996)
Rustic Houses, Forlorn Valleys (1998)
The Cycle of Days and Seasons (1999)
Cold House (2001)
Outside Closer (2005)

Compilation albums 
Structured Disasters (1997)
Compilations 1995-2002 (2003)
Singles Compiled (2003)
Recollected (six CD box set) (2012)

Singles 
"Sirens" (1992)
"Opening into Enclosure" (1993)
"57 White Bread" (1994)
"Carmine" (split) (1995)
"A Harbour of Thoughts" (1995)
"Hem" (split) (1995)
"Lee Faust's Million Piece Orchestra" (1995)
"I've Forgotten How to Live" (1996)
"Secrets Now Known to Others" (Earworm Records, 1996)
"Useless"' (1997)
"Filmed Initiative" (1998)
"The Year of Occasional Lull" (1998)
"(The) Weight" (1998)
"Steward" (split) (2000)
"Home is Where it Hurts" (2001)
"Photographers" (2001)
"You Show No Emotion at All" (2002)
"Themselves" (split) (2004)
"The Lost You" (2004)
"The Negatives" (2005)

References

External links 
  (via archive.org)
 BBC interview
 Label site
 Forum

English electronic music groups
Musical groups established in 1991
1991 establishments in England
Indie rock groups from Leeds
Slumberland Records artists
Domino Recording Company artists
English post-rock groups